Muilheh-ye Sofla (also Romanized as Mūīlḥeh-ye Soflá; also known as Molḩeh-ye Soflá and Moveylḩeh Pā’īn) is a village in Azadeh Rural District, Moshrageh District, Ramshir County, Khuzestan Province, Iran. At the 2006 census, its population was 334, in 59 families.

References 

Populated places in Ramshir County